Bear Lake is a large lake in the northwestern Omineca Country of the North-Central Interior of British Columbia, Canada, located north of Babine and Takla Lakes.  Unlike those two lakes, which are part of the Fraser River drainage, Bear Lake is tributary to the Skeena River via the Bear River, which runs from its northern end.  The community of Bear Lake, also known as Fort Connelly, is located on the lake's northeast side.  The original Fort Connelly may have been, however, at the lake's northern end or on an island in Tsaytut Bay.

References

Lakes of British Columbia
Omineca Country
Cassiar Land District